Ignacio Lautaro Avilés Rodríguez (born May 23, 1992), is an Uruguayan–Chilean footballer who currently plays as a midfielder for Uruguayan side Club Sportivo Cerrito.

Club career
After playing for clubs in his native country, on 2018 he joined Ecuadorian Serie B side Fuerza Amarilla, getting promotion to 2019 Serie A and being immediately relegated to 2020 Serie B. So, on 2020 he moved to Chile using his dual nationality and joined Primera B side San Marcos de Arica.

On 2021 he returned to his native country and joined Cerrito, which was recently promoted to Uruguayan Primera División.

International career
He represented Uruguay U17 at the 2009 South American U-17 Championship – where Uruguay reached the third place – and at the 2009 FIFA U-17 World Cup.

Personal life
Due to his father is Chilean, he holds dual nationality – Uruguayan and Chilean – along with his younger brother Joaquín Avilés, who is a professional footballer that has taken part in a training microcycle of Chile U20.

References

External links

Ignacio Avilés at playmakerstats.com (English version of ceroacero.es)

Living people
1992 births
People from Montevideo
Uruguayan people of Chilean descent
Sportspeople of Chilean descent
Citizens of Chile through descent
Naturalized citizens of Chile
Uruguayan footballers
Uruguay youth international footballers
Uruguayan Primera División players
Uruguayan Segunda División players
Ecuadorian Serie B players
Ecuadorian Serie A players
Primera B de Chile players
Danubio F.C. players
Miramar Misiones players
Villa Española players
C.A. Progreso players
Fuerza Amarilla S.C. footballers
San Marcos de Arica footballers
Club Sportivo Cerrito players
Sportivo Cerrito players
Uruguayan expatriate footballers
Expatriate footballers in Ecuador
Uruguayan expatriate sportspeople in Ecuador
Expatriate footballers in Chile
Uruguayan expatriate sportspeople in Chile
Association football midfielders